Antwain is a given name that is an alternate form of Antoine. Notable people known by that name include the following:

Given name
Antwain Barbour (born 1982), American  basketball player
Antwain Britt (born 1978), American mixed martial artist
Antwain Smith (born 1975), American basketball player
Antwain Spann (born 1983), American football player

Middle name
Dewarick Antwain Spencer, full name of Dewarick Spencer (born 1982) is an American and Egyptian professional basketball

See also

Antwan
Antwaun
Antwaan Randle El
Antowain Smith
Antwaine Wiggins